is a Japanese activist, haemophiliac and member of the House of Councillors (Japan). Ryūhei Kawada became famous for coming out as HIV positive in Japan, where doing so was considered taboo by many.

HIV-tainted blood scandal in Japan

In the late 1980s, between one and two thousand Japanese patients with haemophilia contracted HIV via tainted blood products. Upon discovering he was one of the affected, Ryuhei Kawada joined the lawsuit against  Green Cross Corporation that provided the tainted blood products, which eventually led to the guilty pleas from three executives in 1997.

Political career

In the 2007 Japanese House of Councillors election, Kawada won a seat in the House of Councillors. He has expressed a desire to work on issues of health, welfare, and labour. He has also indicated he will form a Green Party of Japan based on the Rainbow and Greens which supported his campaign.

References

External links

 Ryuhei Kawada official campaign supporters' website

Articles about Ryuhei Kawada (in English)
Japan Times (2007-07-13): Novice candidates have issues
Asahi (2007-07-23): Cover Story: Signs of change
 Boston Globe via Japan Society: Ryuhei Kawada
Statement to Global Young Greens meeting, January 2007 (in English)

Photographs and videos of his campaign
Flickr: Ryuhei Kawada on the campaign trail
Flickr: Ryuhei Kawada
Youtube: Ryuhei Kawada

Japanese activists
Members of the House of Councillors (Japan)
Constitutional Democratic Party of Japan politicians
Your Party politicians
Unity Party (Japan) politicians
21st-century Japanese politicians
Living people
1976 births
People with HIV/AIDS
HIV/AIDS in Japan
Recipients of contaminated haemophilia blood products
Politicians from Tokyo